Yudaris Sánchez Rodriguez (born 15 November 1997) is a Cuban freestyle wrestler. She won the gold medal in her event at the 2018 Pan American Wrestling Championships held in Lima, Peru. In March 2020, she qualified at the 2020 Pan American Wrestling Olympic Qualification Tournament held in Ottawa, Canada to represent Cuba at the 2020 Summer Olympics in Tokyo, Japan.

Career 

In 2016, she competed in the Pan American Olympic Qualification Tournament without successfully qualifying for the 2016 Summer Olympics in Rio de Janeiro, Brazil. She lost her first match against Dorothy Yeats of Canada which meant that she could no longer become one of the top two wrestlers in her event and qualify for the Olympics.

She won the gold medal in the 68 kg event at the 2018 Central American and Caribbean Games held in Barranquilla, Colombia. Later that year, she competed at the 2018 World Wrestling Championships in the 68 kg event without winning a medal. A month later, she won the gold medal at the 2018 World U23 Wrestling Championship held in Bucharest, Romania. In 2019, she won the silver medal in the 68 kg event at the Pan American Wrestling Championships in Buenos Aires, Argentina and later that year she won one of the bronze medals in the 68 kg event at the 2019 Pan American Games in Lima, Peru.

In 2020, she repeated her win of the silver medal at the Pan American Wrestling Championships in Ottawa, Canada. In 2021, she competed in the women's 68 kg event at the 2020 Summer Olympics held in Tokyo, Japan.

Achievements

References

External links 
 

Living people
1997 births
Place of birth missing (living people)
Cuban female sport wrestlers
Pan American Games medalists in wrestling
Pan American Games bronze medalists for Cuba
Medalists at the 2019 Pan American Games
Wrestlers at the 2015 Pan American Games
Wrestlers at the 2019 Pan American Games
Central American and Caribbean Games gold medalists for Cuba
Competitors at the 2018 Central American and Caribbean Games
Central American and Caribbean Games medalists in wrestling
Pan American Wrestling Championships medalists
Wrestlers at the 2020 Summer Olympics
Olympic wrestlers of Cuba
20th-century Cuban women
21st-century Cuban women